"Put a Woman in Charge" is a song by blues musician Keb' Mo' and features country singer Rosanne Cash. The song was released on September 28, 2018 and is the lead single off his album Oklahoma. A music video for the song was released on October 11, 2018 on Keb' Mo's YouTube. The video is dedicated to his mom who died at the age of 91, because she was a strong and powerful leader. The song charted at No. 10 on the Billboard Blues Songs Chart.

The song is currently nominated for "Song of the Year" at the 2020 International Folk Music Awards.

Composition 
Keb' Mo' says "Put A Woman in Charge’ is about trying something else. There have been a lot of great achievements made by men or by the masculine, but maybe, just maybe, we’ve gotten too comfortable with the imbalance of men in power and have fallen short by not listening and embracing what women have to offer when they lead." He also says that he hopes that this song gets women to speak up and be brave about what they do and believe in. In the opening lines of the song Keb' Mo' sings about building borders and walls, he is referring to Donald Trump during these lines as a protest.

Charts

References 

2018 songs
2018 singles
Blues songs
Country rock songs
American folk songs
Songs with feminist themes
Songs written by Beth Nielsen Chapman